Ven. Ampitiye Rahula Maha Thero also known as Ampitiye Sri Rahula Maha Thero also spelt as Ampitiye Rahula Maha Thera (24 December 1913/1914 – 17 February 2020) was a Sri Lankan Sinhalese Buddhist monk. He served as the Chief incumbent of Maharagama Sri Vajiragnana Dharmayathanaya and senior advisor of Supreme Council of the Amarapura Dharmarakshitha Maha Nikaya until his death. He was nicknamed as the Loku Hamuduruwo.

Biography 
He was born as Dharmadasa on 24 December 1913/1914 at Ampitiya, Kandy. He pursued his primary and secondary education at the St. Mary's College, Kandy. His parents were conventional Buddhists who were extremely devoted to Buddhism and sent him to a Dhamma school in Alukgolla Raja Maha Viharaya.

He entered the Order of the Sangha on 4 May 1936 at the age of 22 and received his higher ordination at Udakukkhepa Seema Malakaya at Kelaniya on 30 July 1936. He attended the hermitage affiliated with the University of Peradeniya under the guidance of Madihe Pannaseeha Thero. He was also taught basics of Buddhism by Palane Vajiragnana Thero and Ahangama Sri Pragnaloka Maha Thero. In 1948, he became the Principal of Vajirarama Dhamma School.

He also taught Dhamma to undergraduates in Sinhala and Tamil at the University of Peradeniya and was also instrumental in establishing a Buddhist temple in the University of Peradeniya. Maharagama Dhammasiri Thero, Gangodawila Soma Thero and Thirikunamale Ananda Thero were some prominent students of him. In 1958, he co-founded the Maharagama Bhikku Training Centre along with his guru Madihe Pannaseeha Thero.

Death 
He died on 17 February 2020 in the morning at the age of 106. His funeral was held on 20 February 2020 and it was attended by President Gotabaya Rajapaksa.

References 

1913 births
2020 deaths
Sri Lankan Buddhist monks
Sri Lankan Theravada Buddhists
Alumni of the University of Peradeniya
Sri Lankan centenarians
Men centenarians